Puwanai Sangwan (born 26 October 1995) is a Thai actor.

Filmography

Television

References

1995 births
Living people
Puwanai Sangwan
Puwanai Sangwan
Puwanai Sangwan